Leyton ward is one of the electoral wards of the London Borough of Waltham Forest,  situated in London, England. The ward is the known district of Leyton and is part of the parliamentary constituency of Leyton and Wanstead and the London Assembly constituency of North East.  Leyton ward returns three borough councillors.

Landmarks
Prominent landmarks are Leyton Orient's Brisbane Road ground and New Spitalfields Market.

Councillors
In the council elections of 2006, the ward returned three councillors, two Liberal Democrats and one Labour in the third position. In 2002, Leyton had returned three Liberal Democrats with large majorities. In the 2006 election, the Labour candidate, Miranda Grell made spurious and potentially libellous allegations about her opponent, the  gay Liberal Democrat candidate Barry Smith. While Smith's Liberal Democrat running mates were elected, he was not, and Grell was elected to the third position. Grell was found guilty of making false statements to aid her campaign, in which she accused him of being a paedophile in her canvassing with local residents.

Presiding Judge Woolard said he did not accept her conspiracy theory, as "on two occasions in making statements that were untrue and damaging to one of your fellow candidates", and found her guilty of falsely slurring her opponent.

The by-election for Leyton ward on 14 February 2008 was won by Liberal Democrat Winnie Smith.

The councillors elected in the 2022 election were:
 Rhiannon Eglin (Labour)
 Whitney Ihenachor (Labour)
 Terry Wheeler (Labour)

Notes

Wards of the London Borough of Waltham Forest